Mohiuddin Nagar is a block  and a notified area in Samastipur district in the Indian state of Bihar, India. It derives its name from Sufi saint Shah Afaq Mohiuddin. He was descendant of Shah Qasim Suleiman of Chunar. Earlier this area was known as Sheher Dharhara. There is a fort named Amina Bibi ka Quila commonly known as Fansighar. She was the  wife of Shah Afaq and daughter of rebel Afghan general Shamsher Khan who was killed in battle of Ranisarai with Nawab Alivardi Khan.

Demographics
 India census, Mohiuddin Nagar had a population of 13,764. Males constitute 52% of the population and females 48%. Mohiuddin Nagar has an average literacy rate of 44%, lower than the national average of 59.5%: male literacy is 52%, and female literacy is 35%. In Mohiuddin Nagar, 21% of the population is under 6 years of age. The market of Mohiuddin Nagar is famous between their nearest village.

Famous Places 
The market is full with crowd of different requirements. around 22 villages are near by to whom this market is backbone.

School 
Government High School, Mohiuddin Nagar

Pipal Tree 
There is famous ~ more than 200 years old pipal tree situated in middle market near post office. There is a small temple which was built around 60 years ago.

References

Cities and towns in Samastipur district